Kalipada Biswas (3 December 1899 – 29 December 1969) was an Indian botanist who specialized in the algae of the Indian region and worked at the Calcutta botanical garden erstwhile Royal Botanic Garden, becoming its first Indian director and heading it from 1937 to 1955.

Biswas was born in Calcutta to Sarada Prasad Biswas and grew up at Beltala, studying at the Mitra Institution, Bhowanipur where he was a contemporary of Shyama Prasad Mukherjee. He passed out of Bangabasi College in 1920 and studied under S.P. Agharkar, S.N. Bal, S.C. Banerjee and G.C. Bose. Biswas had a brilliant academic career. He stood first- class first in the M.A. (Botany) examination in 1922 (securing the University Gold Medal). In 1936 he left for Europe and worked at the Royal Botanical Gardens at Kew and Edinburgh and in the Natural History Department of the British Museum. He gained his D.Se. (Edinburgh) in 1937.

He was awarded the Elliot Gold Medal and Prize in 1928 and again in 1936; the Coronation Medal in 1937 for meritorious service in the Royal Botanical Garden and at the Herbarium; the Paul Johannes Briihl Memorial Medal in 1952 for the best research work in Systematic Botany; the Rabindranath Prize in Science in 1951-52 and the Barclay Memorial Medal in 1969.

He  became interested in the algae through the influence of Paul Johannes Brühl and began to examine algae from various waterbodies including Salt Lake and Chilka. He was appointed curator of the herbarium at the Royal Botanic Gardens in Calcutta in 1927. In 1936 he was deputed to study in Edinburgh under Sir W.W. Smith. He received a DSc from Edinburgh University in 1937 and returned to become director of the Botanical Survey of India. After retiring from the botanical garden he became a director of the medical plants scheme of the West Bengal Government in 1954.From 1955 -1956 he was Chairman, Medicinal Plants Committee-member of the Executive Council, Central Indian Medicinal Plants Organization and National Botanic Gardens, Lucknow. He retired in December 1964 but continued to work as an emeritus scientist at the University of Calcutta.

Biswas wrote numerous papers on botany and botanical history. He considered Ficus krishnae as a mutant variety of Ficus bengalensis.

References

External links 
 INSA Fellows
 

20th-century Indian botanists
1899 births
1969 deaths
Scientists from Kolkata